Montague is an unincorporated community in western Christian County, in the U.S. state of Missouri.  The community is on Tory Creek, west of Highlandville.

History
A post office called Montague was established in 1905, and remained in operation until 1908. The origin of the name Montague is obscure.

References

Unincorporated communities in Christian County, Missouri
Unincorporated communities in Missouri